This is a list of schools in Islands District, Hong Kong.

Secondary schools

 Government
  (長洲官立中學)

 Aided
  (佛教慧因法師紀念中學)
 Caritas Chan Chun Ha Field Studies Center (明愛陳震夏郊野學園)
 HKFEW Wong Cho Bau Secondary School
  (sponsored by Sik Sik Yuen) (嗇色園主辦可譽中學暨可譽小學)
 Ling Liang Church E Wun Secondary School
 Po Leung Kuk Mrs. Ma Kam Ming-Cheung Fook Sien College
 Tung Chung Catholic School

 Direct Subsidy Scheme
 Buddhist Fat Ho Memorial College
 Caritas Charles Vath College
 YMCA of Hong Kong Christian College

 Private
 Christian Zheng Sheng College
 Discovery Bay International School
 Discovery College

Primary schools

 Aided
 Bui O Public School (杯澳公立學校)
 CCC Cheung Chau Church Kam Kong Primary School (中華基督教會長洲堂錦江小學)
 CCC Tai O Primary School (中華基督教會大澳小學)
 Cheng Chau Sacred Heart School (長洲聖心學校)
 Ching Chung Hau Po Woon Primary School (青松侯寶垣小學)
 HKFEW Wong Cho Bau School (香港教育工作者聯會黃楚標學校)
 Ho Yu College and Primary School (sponsored by Sik Sik Yuen) (嗇色園主辦可譽中學暨可譽小學)
 Holy Family School (聖家學校)
 Kwok Man School (國民學校)
 Ling Liang Church Sau Tak Primary School (靈糧堂秀德小學)
 Mui Wo School (梅窩學校)
 Northern Lamma School (南丫北段公立小學)
 Po On Commercial Association Wan Ho Kan Primary School (寶安商會溫浩根小學)
 Salvation Army Lam Butt Chung Memorial School (救世軍林拔中紀念學校)
 SKH Wei Lun Primary School (聖公會偉倫小學)
 Tung Chung Catholic School

 Private
 Discovery Bay International School
 Discovery College
 Discovery Mind Primary School (弘志學校)
 Discovery Montessori Academy
 Lantau International School 
 Silvermine Bay School (銀礦灣學校)

Special schools
 Aided
 Hong Chi Shiu Pong Morninghope School (匡智紹邦晨輝學校)

Former schools

 Government
  (新界鄉議局南約區中學) - Mui Wo

 Aided
 Cheung Chau Fisheries Joint Association Public School (長洲漁會公學)

References

Lists of schools in Hong Kong
Islands District